Michael S. Vartan (born November 27, 1968) is a French-American actor, known for his role as Michael Vaughn on the ABC television action drama Alias, his role on the TNT medical drama Hawthorne, and his role on the E! drama The Arrangement as Terence Anderson. His film roles include The Pallbearer, Never Been Kissed, The Next Best Thing, One Hour Photo, Monster-in-Law, Rogue, Colombiana, and Small Town Crime.

Early life
Michael Vartan was born in Boulogne-Billancourt, Hauts-de-Seine, France. He is the son of Edmond "Eddie" Vartan, a musician, and Doris (née Pucher), a painter and artist. His paternal aunt is singer Sylvie Vartan and his stepfather is writer Ian La Frenais. Michael's paternal grandfather was of Armenian and Bulgarian descent, while Michael's paternal grandmother was of Hungarian Jewish background. Michael's mother is a Polish Jewish immigrant to the United States.

Vartan has said about his French background that "The funny thing is I'm actually Polish Jew who happens to be born in France. My mom is Polish and my dad is Bulgarian. I don't have an ounce of French blood. But I work it". He has stated that he tends to be considered a Frenchman in the United States and an American in France.

His parents divorced when he was five and he moved to the United States with his mother. He moved back to France to be with his father until his high school years, and grew up a "farm kid" in a "simple environment" in Fleury, Manche, a small town in Normandy. At age eighteen, Vartan moved back with his mother in Los Angeles, telling her that he wanted to be an artist, because he did not wish to fulfill the mandatory military service required in France. In Los Angeles, he attended an acting school after he was told he possessed acting talent. He had also attended the prestigious Lycée Français de Los Angeles. Vartan now considers himself to be American and stated on the talk show Rove that he would like Australia to be his second home. He is bilingual, being fluent in French and English.

Career
After starring roles in European films, including an acclaimed performance in the Taviani Brothers' Fiorile, and several smaller film roles, Vartan had noticeable supporting roles in major Hollywood movies, including Never Been Kissed (1999), One Hour Photo (2002) and Monster-in-Law (2005). In 2007, he appeared in the Australian horror film Rogue, and starred in the film Jolene in 2008.

Vartan's most notable role to date has been as Michael Vaughn in the American television series Alias (2001–2006).  He played the role of Lancelot in TNT's production of Marion Zimmer Bradley's The Mists of Avalon (2001). Vartan has also had guest appearances on Friends (as Dr. Tim Burke, Tom Selleck's character's son) and Ally McBeal (as Jonathan Basset). He also appeared on the show Kitchen Confidential, which starred his former Alias co-star Bradley Cooper, as a French chef who was Cooper's rival. In September 2007, Vartan played James Walker, a main role in the ABC drama Big Shots. However, the show was canceled after one season.

Vartan co-starred opposite Jada Pinkett Smith in TNT's series Hawthorne. Vartan replaced Jeffrey Nordling, who played the role in the pilot. TNT canceled the series after its third season.

He starred as Terence Anderson on the E! drama The Arrangement.

Vartan co-hosts a weekly live sports program called Advanced Shouting with friends Dan Petriw and Noel Fogelman. The first episode was uploaded to YouTube in June 2020. The broadcast is also available via Facebook.

Personal life

Vartan began dating his Alias co-star Jennifer Garner in mid-2003. After several months of rumors, their break-up was confirmed in August 2004.

In March 2010, Vartan announced his engagement to Lauren Skaar, whom he met in a Whole Foods Market parking lot in Los Angeles in 2009. The couple married on April 2, 2011, at the Pelican Hill Resort in Newport Beach, California. Skaar filed for divorce in July 2014, citing irreconcilable differences.

Vartan has a dog named Millie, with whom he appeared in a PETA video about good canine care and to whom he wrote a "love letter" for an anthology. He is a keen supporter of Australian rules football, having watched the game on numerous visits to Australia, in particular Melbourne. He is good friends with Brendan Fevola and supports Carlton. After the completion of the film Rogue, Vartan got a Southern Cross tattoo on his right arm to show his love for Australia.

Vartan is also a fan of ice hockey, a trait incorporated into his character, Michael Vaughn, on Alias.

Filmography

Film

Television

References

External links
 

1968 births
American Ashkenazi Jews
20th-century American male actors
21st-century American male actors
20th-century French male actors
21st-century French male actors
American male film actors
American male television actors
American people of Armenian descent
American people of Bulgarian descent
American people of Hungarian-Jewish descent
American people of Polish-Jewish descent
Ethnic Armenian male actors
French Ashkenazi Jews
French emigrants to the United States
French male film actors
French male television actors
French people of Armenian descent
French people of Bulgarian descent
French people of Hungarian-Jewish descent
French people of Polish-Jewish descent
Jewish American male actors
Jewish French male actors
Living people
Lycée Français de Los Angeles alumni
People from Boulogne-Billancourt
21st-century American Jews